Fjolla (pronounced Fee-olla) is an Albanian female given name which means "snowflake". The name is mostly used in Kosovo. Notable people with the name include:
Fjolla Kelmendi (born 1990), Kosovar judoka
Fjolla Shala (born 1993), Kosovar footballer

See also
Fiola

Albanian feminine given names